In organic chemistry, thiocarbamates (thiourethanes) are a family of organosulfur compounds. As the prefix thio- suggests, they are sulfur analogues of carbamates. There are two isomeric forms of thiocarbamates: O-thiocarbamates,  (esters), and S-thiocarbamates,  (thioesters).

Synthesis
Thiocarbamates can be synthesised by the reaction of water or alcohols upon thiocyanates (Riemschneider thiocarbamate synthesis):

RSCN + H2O → RSC(=O)NH2
RSCN + R'OH → RSC(=O)NR'H

Similar reactions are seen between alcohols and thiocarbamoyl chlorides such as dimethylthiocarbamoyl chloride; as well as between thiols and cyanates.

Alternatively, they arise by the reaction of amines with carbonyl sulfide.
2 R2NH + COS → [R2NH2+][R2NCOS−]

Reactions
In the Newman-Kwart rearrangement O-thiocarbamates can isomerise to S-thiocarbamates. This reaction, which generally requires high temperatures, is an important method for the synthesis of thiophenols.

Dithiocarbamates

Dithiocarbamates are related to thiocarbamates by the replacement of O by S. Despite this structural similarity their synthesis and chemistry is quite different. Dithiocarbamates and their derivatives are widely used in the vulcanization of rubber.

Borate, Molybdenum, or Zinc thiocarbamates are also used in metal-to-metal lubrication proposes, mainly as an anti-oxidation or anti-extreme pressure (EP) additive. 1-2% of such compounds can be added to internal combustion engine lubricant to increase extreme pressure performance in high operational temperatures.

See also
 Carbamate
 Goitrin
 Tolnaftate

References

 
Functional groups